The Missouri Eastern Correctional Center (MECC) is a state prison for men located in Pacific, Missouri. Since the facility was opened in 1981, it has been owned and operated by the Missouri Department of Corrections. MECC currently has a maximum capacity of 1130 inmates, ranging from low to medium security, as well as housing inmates awaiting transfer to higher level institutions.

References

Prisons in Missouri
Buildings and structures in Franklin County, Missouri
1981 establishments in Missouri